Chatham  is a village in Columbia County, New York, United States. The population was 1,770 at the 2010 census.

The village of Chatham is on the border between the towns of Chatham and Ghent. The village is at the junction of Routes 66 and 203.

History
The village was incorporated in 1869. Chatham was originally named Groats Corners. The village is the home of the 1814 Blinn-Pulver Farmhouse.

Chatham hosts a variety of attractions, such as the Crandell Theater, which shows many popular movies at very reasonable prices. The Mac-Hadyn Theater is a summer stock theater, active from May through September, that puts on Broadway-style shows. The famous stage and film actor Nathan Lane was part of their company at one time.

The Tracy Memorial Village Hall Complex and Union Station are listed on the National Register of Historic Places.

Geography
Chatham is located at  (42.36207, -73.599686). The northern half of the village, and the central business area, is in the town of Chatham, while the southern half is in the town of Ghent.

The village is located on Stony Kill, a waterway that makes a U-shaped bend through the village and flows north to Kinderhook Creek, a tributary of the Hudson River.

Notable people
George McClellan, US congressman
Sanford W. Smith, New York Senator and NY State Supreme Court Justice

Demographics

As of the census of 2000, there were 1,758 people, 742 households, and 425 families residing in the village. The population density was 1,492.0 people per square mile (575.2/km2). There were 802 housing units at an average density of 680.7 per square mile (262.4/km2). The racial makeup of the village was 94.03% White, 3.07% black or African American, .34% Native American, .4% Asian, .11% Pacific Islander, .17% from other races, and 1.88% from two or more races. Hispanic or Latino of any race were 1.65% of the population.

There were 742 households, out of which 31.1% had children under the age of 18 living with them, 41.0% were married couples living together, 12.4% had a female householder with no husband present, and 42.7% were non-families. 37.6% of all households were made up of individuals, and 14.4% had someone living alone who was 65 years of age or older. The average household size was 2.33 and the average family size was 3.06.

In the village, the population was spread out, with 26.1% under the age of 18, 6.8% from 18 to 24, 27.6% from 25 to 44, 24.6% from 45 to 64, and 15.0% who were 65 years of age or older. The median age was 38 years. For every 100 females, there were 90.1 males. For every 100 females age 18 and over, there were 83.6 males.

The median income for a household in the village was $39,063, and the median income for a family was $44,500. Males had a median income of $32,083 versus $24,327 for females. The per capita income for the village was $19,476. About 6.7% of families and 8.4% of the population were below the poverty line, including 8.4% of those under age 18 and 10.7% of those age 65 or over.

As of the 2010 census, Chatham was 86.5% white, 5.0% Hispanic, 3.3% black, 2.4% Multiracial, 2.0% Asian, 0.3% Native American, 0.3 Other race, and 0.06% Native Hawaiian.

Transportation

Chatham has only one traffic light; right turn on red is allowed at that intersection. It has 49 stop signs, 11 yield signs, and one traffic circle. In addition, there are 121 signs regulating parking.

Previous to the NYSDOT renovations, cars driving in the traffic circle on Main Street yielded to cars entering the circle, which is an unusual traffic pattern. This pattern was changed to be in compliance with NY state traffic laws in 2008. NYSDOT supplied funding to rebuild Main Street including installing a new water main, drainage structures, granite curbing and concrete sidewalk. Main Street was closed to vehicular traffic during this period. After Main Street's existing pavement was excavated, the road was filled with crushed stone, providing pedestrian access to shops along the street. Various side streets were repaved with asphalt and new curbing and sidewalk was installed as well. A new retaining wall with H-pile was built on Hudson Avenue. This work was carried out in 2008 and 2009. The prime contractor was A. Colarusso & Son Inc., based in Hudson, New York. During construction, NYS Senator Stephen M. Saland showed up briefly to witness progress.

The village was a hub of the New York Central, Boston and Albany, and Rutland railroads, with three wyes and one roundhouse.

Events
 Columbia County Fair: late August-early September
 Firefighters parade
 Fairgrounds auto show: spring/late May
 Fairgrounds Fourth of July celebration (on the 4th of July)
 Civil War reenactment: summer

References

External links

Chatham Area Business Alliance
Crandell Theatre, the oldest and largest movie theater in Columbia County, built in 1926 on Main Street

Villages in New York (state)
Villages in Columbia County, New York